Emily Bass (born 1 October 1998) is an Australian rugby league footballer who plays as a er for the Brisbane Broncos in the NRL Women's Premiership.

Background
Born in Toowoomba, Queensland, Bass attended Scots PGC College in Warwick, Queensland, where she was a state champion hurdler.

Playing career
In 2021, Bass played for the Queensland Reds in the Super W and represented the Oceania Barbarians at the 2021 Oceania Sevens Championship.

In 2022, Bass switched to rugby league, joining the Brisbane Broncos for the rescheduled 2021 season.

In Round 1 of the 2021 NRL Women's season, Bass made her debut for the Broncos, scoring two tries in a win over the Sydney Roosters.

References

External links
Brisbane Broncos profile

1998 births
Living people
People from Toowoomba
Australian female rugby league players
Australian female rugby union players
Rugby league wingers
Brisbane Broncos (NRLW) players
20th-century Australian women
21st-century Australian women